The , officially  was a conservative political party in Japan.

History
The party was founded in spring 1947 by merging the Progressive Party (Shinpo-tō) of Inukai Takeru with a faction of Liberal Party led by Hitoshi Ashida and obtained 124 seats in 1947 elections. The party had held seven seats in Tetsu Katayama's government in 1947-1948. For some months in 1948, party's leader Ashida was Prime minister.

In March 1948, part of DP members led by Kijūrō Shidehara joined the Liberal Party to form the Democratic Liberal Party. In 1949 elections, the DP got 69 seats. The party was finally merged with the National Cooperative Party to form the National Democratic Party in April 1950.

Election results

House of Representatives

House of Councillors

References

Further reading

 

Defunct political parties in Japan
1947 establishments in Japan
Defunct conservative parties
1950 disestablishments in Japan
Political parties established in 1947
Political parties disestablished in 1950